Demolition was the first album by Australian heavy metal band Dungeon. It featured mainly demo-quality tracks, four of which had been remixed from a previous demo with added bass lines from Justin Sayers and a cover of Blondie's "Call Me". Virgil Donati plays drums on the instrumental track "Changing Moods". This album was only released in Japan and has never been made available anywhere else. "Paradise", "I Am Death" and "Time to Die" would be re-recorded to appear on Resurrection in 1999; a remix of "Call Me" would appear on the limited-release Rising Power in 2003 and "Don't Leave Me" was re-recorded as a bonus track for the band's last album The Final Chapter in 2006.

Track listing 
 Don't Leave Me
 Call Me (Blondie cover)
 Slave of Love
 Paradise 
 One Shot at Life
 Changing Moods
 These Times
 Time to Die
 I Am Death
 Lies
 Vodka Frenzy
 The Duel
 Reflections

Personnel 

 Lord Tim Grose – vocals, guitar, keyboards
 Dale Corney – guitar, vocals
 Stephen Mikulic – guitar
 Justin Sayers – bass, vocals
 Wayne Harris – drums
 Virgil Donati – drums, track 6
 Pru Haggarty – backing vocals

1996 albums
Dungeon (band) albums